Kamandar (also, Komandar) is a village in the Shamkir Rayon of Azerbaijan.  The village forms part of the municipality of Ələsgərli.

References 

Populated places in Shamkir District